Othorus or Othoros was a town of the Chalcidice in ancient Macedonia. It belonged to the Delian League since it appears in the tribute records of Athens between 448/7 and 434/3 BCE, as well as in a tributary decree of 422/1 BCE. It is probable that it was one of the cities of the Chalcidice that rebelled against Athens in the year 432 BCE.

Its site is unlocated.

References

Populated places in ancient Macedonia
Former populated places in Greece
Geography of ancient Chalcidice
Members of the Delian League
Lost ancient cities and towns